Lost Souls or The Lost Souls may refer to:

Film, television, and radio
 Lost Souls (1980 film), a Hong Kong film produced by Shaw Brothers
 The Lost Souls (film), a 1991 Hong Kong film produced by Golden Harvest
 Lost Souls (1998 film), an American television film directed by Jeff Woolnough
 Lost Souls (2000 film), an American film directed by Janusz Kamiński
 "Lost Souls" (Arrow), a 2015 television episode
 "Lost Souls" (Supergirl), a 2021 television episode
 "Lost Souls", a 1998 episode of Voltron: The Third Dimension
 "Lost Souls" (Torchwood), a 2008 radio episode of the BBC TV series

Games
 Lost Souls (MUD), a text-based online role-playing game
 Lost Souls (role-playing game), a 1991 pen and paper role-playing game
 Dark Fall: Lost Souls, the 2009 third installment in the Dark Fall adventure game series
 Earth 2150: Lost Souls, a 2002 expansion to the computer game Earth 2150

Literature
 Lost Souls (Brite novel), a 1992 horror novel by Poppy Z. Brite
 Lost Souls (Koontz novel), a 2010 Frankenstein novel by Dean Koontz
 Lost Souls, a 2010 book by Lena Herzog
 Lost Souls, in Marvel Comics, a tribe of the fictional superhumans the Neo

Music

Albums
 Lost Souls (The Raindogs album), 1990
 Lost Souls (Doves album) or the title song, 2000
 The Lost Souls, by Niraj Chag, 2009
 Lost Souls (Loreena McKennitt album) or the title song, 2018
 Lost Souls, an EP by Knife Party, 2019
 Lost Souls (Vory album), 2022

Songs
 "Lost Souls", by 2Pac and Outlawz from Gang Related – The Soundtrack, 1997
 "Lost Souls", by Book of Love, B-side of "I Touch Roses", 1985
 "Lost Souls", by Born of Osiris from Angel or Alien, 2021
 "Lost Souls", by Pestilence from Testimony of the Ancients, 1991
 "The Lost Souls", by AFI from The Art of Drowning, 2000
 "The Lost Souls", by Asking Alexandria from The Black, 2016

See also
 
 Lost Soul (disambiguation)